Melbourne tram route 3 is operated by Yarra Trams on the Melbourne tram network from Melbourne University to Malvern East. The  route is operated out of Glenhuntly depot with Z and B class trams. On weekends route 3 operates as route 3a and diverts via St Kilda Beach.

History
The origins of route 3 lie in separate tram lines. The section of track between Queensberry Street (Stop 4) and Brighton Road (Stop 35) is the oldest section of this route, dating back to the Brighton Road cable tram which opened on 11 October 1888 by the Melbourne Tramway & Omnibus Company. This cable tram line was electrified in stages by the Melbourne & Metropolitan Tramways Board. The section between Domain Interchange (Stop 20) and St Kilda Junction (Stop 30) was electrified on 27 December 1925. The section between Queensberry Street and City Road (near Stop 14) was electrified on the same day. The line between City Road and Domain Interchange was electrified on 24 January 1926, and the line between St Kilda Junction and Carlisle Street (Stop 35) was finally electrified on 29 August 1926.

The section of route 3 between Brighton Road (Stop 35) and Malvern East (Darling Road) was constructed by the Prahran & Malvern Tramways Trust (PMTT). Initially, a line was opened from St Kilda Beach to Hawthorn Road along Carlisle Street/Balaclava Road on 12 April 1913. This line was extended east by the PMTT from Hawthorn Road to Darling Road, Malvern East on 13 November 1913. Meanwhile, the Melbourne, Brunswick & Coburg Tramway Trust (MBCTT) constructed the section of Route 3 north of Queensberry Street towards Melbourne University. This section opened on 31 October 1916.

On 12 November 1961, trams operating on Route 3 (Route 4D before 1970) on Sunday were replaced by bus route 377 to save operating costs. Sunday trams were reinstated on 8 August 1993 following the abolition of conductors.

Route 3 was allocated to the line between the City (Swanston Street) to Malvern East (Darling Road) on 1 November 1970 following a major route number revision for trams running on Swanston Street. Prior to this, the line was run by Route 4D, an allocation that dates back to 1930. Trams traditionally terminated at the Victoria Street terminus, but following an accident in 1991, trams instead terminated at the Queensberry Street crossover. Due to congestion during peak hours at the crossover, some trams continued north to the Melbourne University. Finally on 17 January 1996, a permanent shunt was built at Melbourne University. From then on, route 3 trams were altered run full-time to Melbourne University.

During the 2006 Commonwealth Games, the route was renumbered 53 and extended to West Coburg during peak hour and the Dudley Street sidings during off peak, from Domain Interchange, along route 55 to alleviate congestion along St Kilda Road.

On 31 January 2009, route 3 was altered on the weekends to form route 3a, diverting from the regular route at St Kilda Junction and travelling via Fitzroy Street, The Esplanade and Carlisle Street to rejoin the regular route at the corner of St Kilda Road and Carlisle Street. This was to alleviate overcrowding on route 16.

Route

Route 3 operates from Melbourne University travelling south through the CBD on Swanston Street via Melbourne Central and Flinders Street stations. After crossing the Yarra River it continues south along St Kilda Road turning east into Carlisle Street, Balaclava then travelling through St Kilda East, where Carlisle Street becomes Balaclava Road, continuing east travelling through Caulfield North. After passing Caulfield station, it crosses Dandenong Road, and continues east along Waverley Road, Malvern East, terminating at Darling Road.

Route 3a weekend variation
On weekends, route 3 runs as route 3a, diverting from the regular route at St Kilda Junction and travelling via St Kilda on Fitzroy Street, The Esplanade and Carlisle Street, passing St Kilda Beach and Luna Park before rejoining the regular route at the corner of St Kilda Road and Carlisle Street.

Operation
Routes 3 and 3a are operated out of Glenhuntly depot and is predominantly run by Z class trams with B class trams also used.

Route map

References

External links

003
003
Transport in the City of Port Phillip
Transport in the City of Stonnington
1970 establishments in Australia